Nurlan Djambululy Kapparov (Nūrlan Djambulūly Qapparov; 30 March 1970 – 26 March 2015) was a Kazakh politician and businessman who served as a Minister of Environment Protection and Minister of Environment and Water from 20 January 2012 to 6 August 2014. Before his death, Kapparov was the chairman of the Board of Kazatomprom.

Biography

Early life and education 
Kapparov was born in the city of Alma-Ata (now Almaty). He graduated from the Republican Physics and Mathematics School. Until 7th grade, he studied in the Village School 120. From 1987 to 1991, Kapparov studied at the Al-Farabi Kazakh National University. In 2003, he earned a degree as engineer economist and masters in public administration from the Harvard Kennedy School.

Career 
While studying, Kapparov served in the Soviet Army from 1987 to 1989. In 1991, Kapparov he founded the company Accept and from 1997 to 1999, he was the chief executive of the national company KazTransOil and oil and gas company Kazakhoil. 

In 1999, Kapparov became a Vice Minister for Energy, Industry and Mineral Resources and in 2001, as Vice Minister of Energy and Mineral Resources. 

On 20 January 2012, Kapparov was appointed as Minister of Environment Protection. After the Ministry was reorganized on 11 November 2013, he became the Minister of Environment and Water and served the post until it was abolished on 6 August 2014. Kapparov then became the chairman of the Board of Kazatomprom.

Death 
Kapparov died unexpectedly on 26 March 2015 in Beijing from a heart attack.

References 

1970 births
2015 deaths
People from Almaty
Kazakhstani businesspeople
Government ministers of Kazakhstan
Al-Farabi Kazakh National University alumni
Harvard Kennedy School alumni